İbrahim Kakış (born 21 July 1959) is a Turkish windsurfer. He competed in the men's Division II event at the 1988 Summer Olympics.

References

1959 births
Living people
Turkish male sailors (sport)
Turkish windsurfers
Olympic sailors of Turkey
Sailors at the 1988 Summer Olympics – Division II
Place of birth missing (living people)